Liceo de Monterrey is a private girls school located in Nuevo León, México, established in 1978. It offers kindergarten, primary, junior high and high school education. Its high school has offered the International Baccalaureate diploma (IB) since 2001.

References

Education in Nuevo León
International Baccalaureate schools in Mexico
Girls' schools in Mexico
Educational institutions established in 1978
1978 establishments in Mexico
Private schools in Mexico